Eric Weaver (born 1 July 1943) was a Welsh footballer who played as an outside right in the Football League.

His son is Jason Weaver, a former classic winning jockey who currently works as a presenter on Sky Sports Racing and ITV Racing. His daughter is Samantha Weaver, an Emmy award winning make-up artist working and living in Los Angeles, CA.

References

External links

1943 births
Living people
Welsh footballers
People from Rhymney
Sportspeople from Caerphilly County Borough
Trowbridge Town F.C. players
Swindon Town F.C. players
Notts County F.C. players
Northampton Town F.C. players
Boston United F.C. players
Telford United F.C. players
English Football League players
Association football outside forwards